San Paolo Bel Sito is a comune (municipality) in the Metropolitan City of Naples  in the Italian region of Campania.  San Paolo Bel Sito is located about 25 km northeast of Naples.  
 
San Paolo Bel Sito borders the municipalities of Liveri and Nola.

References

Cities and towns in Campania